The Women's 400 metre freestyle competition of the swimming events at the 2015 World Aquatics Championships was held on 2 August with the heats and the final.

Records
Prior to the competition, the existing world and championship records were as follows.

The following new records were set during this competition.

Results

Heats
The heats were held at 11:03.

Final

The final was held at 18:23.

References

Women's 400 metre freestyle
2015 in women's swimming